Atli Pætursson Dam (12 September 1932 – 7 February 2005) was a Faroese politician who served as Prime Minister of the Faroe Islands on three occasions, most recently from 1991 to 1993. To this date, he is the longest-serving Prime Minister in Faroese history, having served a total of 16 years.

He was born in Tvøroyri in 1932 as the son of Peter Mohr Dam and Sigrid Ragnhild, née Strøm. He was educated engineer in 1964 and worked for the Danish company Haldor Topsøe until he became prime minister in 1970. He was vice president of the Faroese Mortgage Institution (Føroya Realkreditt) from 1981 to 1985, and again from 1989 until his death.

He was elected to the Løgting in 1970 and became Minister of Fisheries the same year, being appointed prime minister in the same year.

In addition, he was elected as one of two Faroese members of the Danish Folketing from 1987 to 1988 and 1990 to 1994.

In the wake of the Faroese financial crisis, compounded by his health issues, Dam resigned as prime minister and head of the Social Democratic Party on 18 February 1993, and was succeeded by Marita Petersen. 

One of his biggest political achievements included his negotiations with the Danish Prime Minister Poul Schlüter, which resulted in the Faroese underground and all natural resources thereof becoming property of the Faroese state; before that, it belonged to the Danish.

He was not re-elected for the Løgting at the 1994 elections.

References 
Løgtingið 150 – Hátíðarrit, vol. 2 (2002), page 265. (PDF)

1932 births
2005 deaths
Prime Ministers of the Faroe Islands
Fisheries Ministers of the Faroe Islands
Social Democratic Party (Faroe Islands) politicians
Faroese members of the Folketing
People from Tvøroyri
Children of national leaders